Allegiant Stadium is a domed stadium located in Paradise, Nevada. It is the home stadium for the Las Vegas Raiders of the National Football League (NFL), the University of Nevada, Las Vegas (UNLV) Rebels college football team, the Las Vegas Bowl, and the Vegas Kickoff Classic.

At $1.9 billion, it is the second-most expensive stadium in the world. Construction of the stadium began on November 13, 2017, and its certificate of occupancy was issued on July 31, 2020.

Design

For Allegiant Stadium, Raiders owner Mark Davis retained the same architecture firm, MANICA Architecture, that had designed the previously proposed Carson Stadium near Los Angeles. Davis retained much of the look from the Carson stadium because he "fell in love with the overall design of it". Allegiant Stadium is a 10-level domed stadium featuring an ETFE roof, silver and black exterior with light-up strips installed by YESCO, a  media mesh video screen facing Interstate 15, and large retractable curtain-like side windows facing the Las Vegas Strip. The north endzone area in front of the retractable windows contains a large torch that houses a flame in honor of Al Davis, the late long-time owner of the Raiders.

The stadium has a roll-in natural Bermuda grass field similar to the one at State Farm Stadium in Glendale, Arizona, which is primarily used for NFL games. The main advantages of such a configuration is that it allows the natural playing surface to be exposed to natural sunlight when not in use and allows other events to be held at the facility without any risk of damage to the grass. Unlike the Arizona facility (which does not have a varsity tenant) Allegiant Stadium also has an artificial turf field, which is primarily used for college football games. This design was chosen because UNLV prefers to play on an artificial turf surface, and also due to concerns that use of the grass field by two teams would cause excessive wear to the playing surface. The artificial turf is placed directly on the stadium's concrete floor, and the tray holding the grass field is designed so that it can roll in and out without disrupting the turf underneath it.

There are 2,700 parking spots surrounding the stadium and 6,000 in proximity to it. More than 35,000 parking spaces are located within a mile of Allegiant Stadium.

History

Planning and approval
In January 2016, reports emerged that Las Vegas Sands was considering developing a stadium in conjunction with Majestic Realty and UNLV, on a  site on Tropicana Avenue owned by UNLV. UNLV had been in the market for a new stadium to replace Sam Boyd Stadium since at least 2011. Raiders owner Mark Davis visited Las Vegas on January 29 to tour the site and meet with Sands chairman Sheldon Adelson and other local figures. The Raiders, who had been trying to get a new stadium built for the team since the 1980s, had just missed out on relocating to Los Angeles that same month with the Rams and Chargers moving into a new stadium in Inglewood, California and were at an impasse in Oakland. In order for the team to relocate to Las Vegas, a new stadium was required, since Sam Boyd Stadium was undersized for the NFL and there were no other professional-caliber stadiums in Nevada. The Raiders had previously played a preseason game in Las Vegas at Cashman Field against the Houston Oilers during the 1964 American Football League (AFL) preseason and owner Al Davis considered relocating the team there.

On March 21, 2016, when asked about Las Vegas, Davis said, "I think the Raiders like the Las Vegas plan," and "it's a very very very intriguing and exciting plan." Davis also met with Nevada Governor Brian Sandoval about the stadium plan. On April 1, 2016, Davis met with UNLV officials and toured Sam Boyd Stadium to evaluate whether it could serve as a temporary home for the team.

On April 28, 2016, Davis said he wanted to move the Raiders to Las Vegas and pledged $500 million toward constructing the proposed $1.4-billion domed stadium. "Together we can turn the Silver State into the silver and black state," Davis said.

In the spring of 2016, the board of directors of Las Vegas Sands rejected Adelson's stadium proposal. Adelson decided to move ahead with the stadium as an individual investment, pledging $650 million of his personal wealth to the project.

The viability of the Tropicana Avenue site was called into serious question in June 2016, when Southwest Airlines objected to the location because its proximity to the northern end of one of Harry Reid International Airport's runways could negatively affect the safety and capacity of air traffic at the airport. The list of potential locations soon expanded to nine candidates, including the sites of the Wild Wild West casino, the Wynn golf course, the Riviera casino, the Las Vegas Festival Grounds, and Cashman Center. By September, the list was narrowed to two possibilities: the Bali Hai Golf Club, south of Mandalay Bay, and a vacant lot on Russell Road, just west of Interstate 15.

On August 25, 2016, the Raiders filed a trademark application for "Las Vegas Raiders" on the same day renderings of a proposed stadium design were released. On September 15, 2016, the Southern Nevada Tourism Infrastructure Committee unanimously voted to recommend and approve $750 million for the Las Vegas stadium plan.

Majestic Realty revealed in October 2016 that it had withdrawn from the stadium project.

In October 2016, Sandoval called a special session of the Nevada Legislature to consider the stadium and other tourism-related proposals. The funding bill for the stadium was approved by a 16–5 vote in the Senate and by 28–13 in the Assembly, and was signed into law by Sandoval on October 17. The bill allowed Clark County to increase its hotel tax to raise the $750 million in funding.

The Raiders filed relocation papers on January 19 to move from Oakland to Las Vegas. On January 26, 2017, the Raiders submitted a proposed lease agreement for the stadium. It was reported that the Raiders had selected the Russell Road site as the stadium location, the team would pay one dollar in rent, and that they could control the naming rights for both the stadium and plaza and in addition keep signage sponsorship revenue.

Days after the Raiders' announced proposal, Adelson dropped out of the stadium project, pulling his proposed $650 million contribution. Shortly after this announcement, Goldman Sachs, which had planned to finance part of the project, withdrew as well. As a result, the Raiders were expected to increase their contribution from $500 million to $1.15 billion.

On March 6, the Raiders revealed Bank of America would lend $650 million to replace the Adelson portion of the funding.

NFL owners voted to approve the move by a margin of 31–1 on March 27. The next day, the Raiders and the Las Vegas Stadium Authority began accepting deposits for season tickets for the new stadium. The Raiders announced that they planned to remain in Oakland until the stadium was complete.

The Raiders closed the purchase of the land for the stadium at the Russell Road site on May 1. The purchase price was reported at $77.5 million. On May 11, it was announced that in a joint venture Mortenson Construction and McCarthy Construction would be the developers for the stadium. Mortenson previously worked on U.S. Bank Stadium in Minneapolis. The stadium authority approved a stadium lease with the Raiders on May 18. The lease was to be for 30 years with four successive extension options of five years each.

Construction

On September 18, construction activity began on the stadium site with site preparation. A groundbreaking ceremony was held on November 13. The ceremony featured NFL Commissioner Roger Goodell, Raiders owner Mark Davis, his mother Carol Davis, various Raiders legends including Howie Long, Jim Plunkett, Tom Flores and Ray Guy, Las Vegas and Nevada politicians such as Governor Brian Sandoval, Las Vegas Mayor Carolyn Goodman, Clark County Commissioner Steve Sisolak and stadium authority head Steve Hill. The event was hosted by George Lopez and included other celebrities including Carlos Santana, longtime Vegas icon Wayne Newton, and Howie Dorough and Nick Carter of the Backstreet Boys. It also featured a tribute to the victims of the nearby 2017 Las Vegas shooting, including a performance by Judith Hill and the Las Vegas House of Blues Gospel Choir performing ‘Rise up’ and the lighting of 58 beams of light, symbolizing the 58 victims who were killed in the attack.

In January, construction crews began blasting caliche rock with dynamite to excavate and create the stadium bowl.

On August 27, Clark County gave the stadium a new address, rechristening it from its original 5617 Dean Martin Drive address to 3333 Al Davis Way.

On May 24, 2019, it was announced that 20 additional suites would be added to the stadium in the south end zone, with six suites on the main concourse and 14 suites in the lower suite level, one section above the main concourse.The suites were added in an effort to make the stadium more attractive for a Super Bowl.

On January 27, 2023, the Raiders announced additional suites would be added on the 100 level sidelines in advance of the 2023 season and in preparation for hosting Super Bowl LVIII in 2024.

Opening and COVID-19 restrictions
Clark County officials declared that the stadium met its substantial completion date on July 31, 2020, meaning it could issue a certificate of occupancy and officially begin leasing the venue to the Las Vegas Raiders. Work would still continue, with the project closeout scheduled for October 2020. The team held its first closed-door practice in the stadium on August 21, with Mark Davis nicknaming his team's new home "The Death Star".

The opening of the stadium was complicated by the COVID-19 pandemic in Nevada. The original opening event at the stadium was scheduled to be a Garth Brooks concert but the event was postponed to 2021 due to the pandemic.

The Raiders did not admit spectators at any of their games during the 2020 season "based on our commitment to protect the health of our fans and the entire community". Davis publicly stated that he did not want to inhibit the ability for any of the Raiders' season ticketholders to attend games, and vowed to not attend any game at Allegiant Stadium until spectators are able to attend.

The first event at the stadium was a Monday Night Football game on September 21, 2020, where the Raiders defeated the New Orleans Saints 34–24. Saints kicker Wil Lutz scored the stadium's first points on a 31-yard field goal on the opening drive, and running back Alvin Kamara scored the stadium's first touchdown on a one-yard run at 3:55. The first Raiders touchdown was a second-quarter three-yard touchdown reception by fullback Alec Ingold, one of three touchdown passes on the night for quarterback Derek Carr.

The first UNLV Rebels game at the stadium was on October 31, 2020, a Rebels loss to the Nevada Wolf Pack 37–19 in the Battle for Nevada. The game was the first event in the stadium to have fans in attendance. With the start of the delayed Mountain West Conference season, UNLV played games at a maximum capacity of 2,000 spectators, or 3% of the 65,000 capacity, with seating zones separated by 25 feet and seating no more than 250 people each.

The Raiders played their first game at the stadium with fans in attendance on September 13, 2021, a Week 1 Monday Night Football matchup against the Baltimore Ravens. The team required fans entering the stadium to show either proof of COVID-19 vaccination or receive a vaccination at the stadium and wear masks.

Financing
The original budget for construction of the stadium was $1.8 billion. The budget was increased twice in 2019. The first time was in May 2019 when the trusses had to be retrofitted. Don Webb received an additional $40 million at the May 23, 2020 Stadium Authority Board meeting to cover the overages. The second time was in September 2019. Don Webb received another $90 million to cover the extra shifts required to fix the broken truss issue. The overages increased the new budget to $1.97 billion; $200 million over the original budget of $1.8 billion. Ultimately, the stadium was completed $25 million under the increased budget but $175 million over the original $1.8 billion budget.

Of this $2 billion, $78 million was spent to purchase the land, $1.33 billion was spent on construction, $123 million on furniture, fixtures, and equipment, $234 million on design and engineering, and $31 million on utilities and infrastructure. Some reports gave a budget of $2 billion, which also included $100 million to build a separate Raiders practice facility.

The financing for the project came in the form of $750 million in public funding and $1.1 billion from the Raiders. The public portion of the funding came from municipal bonds issued by Clark County, backed by the proceeds of a special tax on hotel rooms in the Las Vegas area, which took effect in March 2017. The Raiders' contribution included a $650 million loan from Bank of America, $200 million from the NFL's stadium loan program, and $300 million from sales of personal seat licenses at the stadium, naming rights for the stadium, and sponsorships. On August 5, 2019, the Raiders announced the team had reached an agreement with Summerlin-based Allegiant Air's owner, Allegiant Travel Company, for the naming rights for the first 30 years of the stadium's use beginning in 2020.

Local government does not receive any rent or revenue sharing from the stadium, because such an arrangement would not be compatible with the tax-exempt status of the bonds that were issued for stadium construction. Proponents instead argued that the public financing would be justified by increased economic activity and tax revenue related to the stadium. Critics have argued that the economic projections were based on overly optimistic assumptions.

A total of $645 million in construction bonds sold out in 90 minutes in April 2018, representing Clark County's contribution to the project beyond room taxes already collected.

Tenants and events
The stadium serves as the home of the Las Vegas Raiders and replaced Sam Boyd Stadium as home of UNLV Rebels football.

College football

Pac-12 Football Championship Game
On July 24, 2019, the Pac-12 Conference announced that the 2020 and 2021 Pac-12 Football Championship Game would be played at Allegiant Stadium, moving from Levi's Stadium. Due to the COVID-19 pandemic, the debut of the game in Las Vegas was delayed to 2021, with the 2020 game instead being held at the Los Angeles Memorial Coliseum — home venue of the South division champion USC Trojans.

Las Vegas Bowl
Allegiant Stadium is the host of the Las Vegas Bowl, which moved from Sam Boyd Stadium. The game features a team from the Pac-12 against a team from the SEC or Big Ten, alternating annually. The inaugural game was expected to be held in 2020, but that year's edition of the Las Vegas Bowl was cancelled due to the COVID-19 pandemic. The inaugural 2021 edition featured Wisconsin defeating Arizona State 20-13.

Vegas Kickoff Classic
In March 2021, a new neutral site college football game dubbed the Vegas Kickoff Classic was announced. Administered by the Las Vegas Bowl, the game is a yearly neutral site college football game that takes place each September. The inaugural edition featured the BYU Cougars defeating the Arizona Wildcats 24-16 on September 4, 2021.  The official attendance of 54,541 fans was the largest crowd to ever watch a college football game (or any other college athletic event) in the history of the state of Nevada.

East–West Shrine Bowl
In July 2021, it was announced that Allegiant Stadium would host the East–West Shrine Bowl on February 3, 2022 as part of the NFL Pro Bowl week.

Shamrock Series (Notre Dame-BYU)
In September 2021, it was announced that Allegiant Stadium will host a college football game between the Notre Dame Fighting Irish and the BYU Cougars on October 8, 2022, as part of Notre Dame's Shamrock Series, with the Fighting Irish as the home team.

NFL

Pro Bowl
On June 16, 2020, the NFL announced that the stadium would host the 2021 Pro Bowl. The game was deferred to 2022 due to the COVID-19 pandemic. The game featured American Football Conference defeating the National Football Conference by a score of 41-35. The 2023 Pro Bowl Games was hosted on Sunday February 5, 2023.

Super Bowl LVIII
Allegiant Stadium will host Super Bowl LVIII on February 11, 2024.

Soccer
Allegiant Stadium hosted the 2021 CONCACAF Gold Cup Final on August 1, 2021.

The stadium also hosted the final of the 2021 Leagues Cup between Major League Soccer and Liga MX teams.

Concerts

Professional wrestling

Awards ceremonies
On November 18, 2021, it was announced that Allegiant Stadium would host the 57th Academy of Country Music Awards on March 7, 2022.

Final Four
On November 22, 2022, the NCAA Division I Men’s Basketball Committee selected the stadium to host Las Vegas first Final Four and National Championship games on April 1-3, 2028.

See also

 Oakland Raiders relocation to Las Vegas
 T-Mobile Arena, the home of the National Hockey League's Vegas Golden Knights
 Las Vegas Ballpark, the current home of the Pacific Coast League's Las Vegas Aviators
 2020 Las Vegas Raiders season
 2020 UNLV Rebels football team

Notes

References

External links

 
 Las Vegas Stadium Authority

2020 establishments in Nevada
American football venues in Nevada
College football venues
Covered stadiums in the United States
Las Vegas Bowl
Las Vegas Raiders stadiums
Music venues in the Las Vegas Valley
National Football League venues
NCAA bowl game venues
Buildings and structures in Paradise, Nevada
Retractable-pitch stadiums
Sports venues completed in 2020
UNLV Rebels football venues
Soccer venues in Nevada
CONCACAF Gold Cup stadiums